The British Columbia government ministry for Social Development and Social Innovation is responsible for  providing residents in need with supports to help them achieve their potential.

References

British Columbia government departments and agencies